Riihimäki glass was a reputed glass company in Riihimäki, Finland, in operation from 1910, when it was founded by Mikko Adolf Kolehmainen, to 1990. Their production ranged from basic to high quality glass ornaments, which are now sought after as collectibles, especially some of their vases. Riihimäki products are readily available via collectors' web sites, as are their values.

It produced everyday glassware and art glass until 1976 and cut glass until 1977. After that, it made only machine produced glass and plastic packaging. Ahlstrom Corporation purchased the company in 1980, and closed the Riihimäki plant in 1990.

It was Nanny Still who joined the design team by winning the Nordic art competition the firm held in 1949.

Finnish Glass Museum 

Since 1980, the Finnish Glass Museum has been housed in then a glass factory building where Riihimäki Glass started a manufacturing blown glass in 1921. The original owner of that facility was Paloheimo since 1914, which financially supported Riihimäki Glass at its latter stage of operation. The manufacturing at that factory shifted from glass to plastic packaging, then to screen printing.

Footnotes

Note

References

Further reading 

 Andy McConnell (2006) 20th-century Glass. Miller's Guides.
 Riihimäen Lasi Oy 1910–1960, Riihimäen lasi 1960, p.172. Historiikin kirjoittanut V. Länsiluoto.
 
 Hoffrén, Jouko ; Penttilä Kalevi. (1979) Riihimäen historia I [History of Riihimäki I], pp.347–359,904–921. Karisto, Hämeenlinna.

External links 

 Glass objects made by Riihimäki glass Designlasi.com

Glassmaking companies of Finland
Riihimäki